Kenneth Mark Holland (born November 10, 1955) is a Canadian-American ice hockey executive and former goaltender. Holland is currently the president of hockey operations and general manager of the Edmonton Oilers of the National Hockey League. Holland assumed his role in Edmonton on May 7, 2019, after a long front-office tenure with the Detroit Red Wings, serving as executive vice president and general manager of the club from 1997 to 2019 and winning three Stanley Cup championships. In 2009, Holland was listed as second-best overall on Sports Illustrated's list of the top sports executives of the 2000s. As a goaltender, Holland was drafted in the 12th round, 188th overall by the Toronto Maple Leafs in the 1975 NHL Entry Draft. He played four NHL games with the Hartford Whalers and the Red Wings between 1980 and 1984.

Managerial career

Detroit Red Wings
After his playing career ended, Holland took a job with the Red Wings as a scout in Western Canada. He subsequently served seven years as Director of Amateur Scouting and three as assistant general manager. On July 18, 1997, he was promoted to general manager, executive vice president and alternate governor of the Detroit Red Wings. The 2012–13 season was his 16th as general manager and his 30th year overall with the Red Wings organization. He has won the Stanley Cup four times with Detroit: the first in 1997 as assistant general manager and goaltending coach, and the latter three as general manager in 1998, 2002 and 2008.

With Detroit, Holland gained a reputation as one of the most successful general managers in the NHL.  Under his leadership as GM the Red Wings won the Central Division ten times, the regular-season Conference title five times, the Presidents' Trophy four times, and the Stanley Cup three times, and won more regular-season games (789) and postseason games (118) than any other NHL team.

On August 14, 2014, the Red Wings announced they signed Holland to a four-year contract extension through the end of the 2017–18 season. On April 7, 2018, the Red Wings announced they signed Holland to a two-year contract extension through the end of the 2019–20 season. On April 19, 2019, the Red Wings announced that Holland had been promoted to senior vice president of the team, and signed a multi-year contract extension. This promotion was done in part to accommodate hiring Steve Yzerman as general manager.

Edmonton Oilers
On May 7, 2019, the Edmonton Oilers named Holland general manager and president of hockey operations. The deal was for a reported five-year term and filled a GM spot that had been open since January.

Personal life
Holland and his wife Cindi live in Edmonton and have four children: Brad, Julie, Rachel, and Greg. On July 12, 2011, Holland, his wife Cindi, and their youngest daughter Rachel became United States citizens. Holland's youngest son, Greg, was sworn in on July 15, 2011.

Career statistics

Regular season and playoffs

Awards
 NAHL Second All-Star Team (1977)
 AHL Second All-Star Team (1982)
 Inducted into Binghamton (New York) Hall of Fame, 1998
 Inducted into the Hockey Hall of Fame, 2020
 Awarded the Freedom of the City of Vernon, British Columbia on 26 October 2021.

References

External links
 
 Ken Holland's trades as GM of the Red Wings

1955 births
Living people
Adirondack Red Wings players
Binghamton Dusters players
Binghamton Whalers players
Broome Dusters players
Canadian ice hockey coaches
Canadian ice hockey goaltenders
Detroit Red Wings coaches
Detroit Red Wings executives
Detroit Red Wings general managers
Detroit Red Wings players
Detroit Red Wings scouts
Edmonton Oilers executives
Hartford Whalers players
Hockey Hall of Fame inductees
Ice hockey people from British Columbia
Medicine Hat Tigers players
National Hockey League executives
National Hockey League general managers
Sportspeople from Vernon, British Columbia
Springfield Indians players
Stanley Cup champions
Toronto Maple Leafs draft picks
Vernon Vikings players